Bruce Merritt (born 1958) is an American sprint canoeist who competed as a member of the US National Team from 1978 to 1988. Competing in two Summer Olympics, 1984 and 1988, he earned his best Olympic finish of seventh in the C-1 1000 m event at Los Angeles in 1984.

References 

1958 births
American male canoeists
Canoeists at the 1984 Summer Olympics
Canoeists at the 1988 Summer Olympics
Living people
Olympic canoeists of the United States
Pan American Games gold medalists for the United States
Pan American Games medalists in canoeing
Canoeists at the 1987 Pan American Games
Medalists at the 1987 Pan American Games